Libycosuchus is an extinct genus of North African crocodylomorph possibly related to Notosuchus; it is part of the monotypic Libycosuchidae and Libycosuchinae. It was terrestrial, living approximately 95 million years ago in the Cenomanian stage of the Late Cretaceous. Fossil remains have been found in the Bahariya Formation in Egypt, making it contemporaneous with the crocodilian Stomatosuchus, and  dinosaurs, including  Spinosaurus. It was one of the few fossils discovered by Ernst Stromer that wasn't destroyed by the Royal Air Force during the bombing of Munich in 1944. The type species, L. brevirostis, was named in 1914 and described in 1915.

References

Late Cretaceous crocodylomorphs of Africa
Terrestrial crocodylomorphs
Bahariya Formation
Ziphosuchians
Prehistoric pseudosuchian genera
Cenomanian genera